Khristodoulos Katsinioridis (born 24 November 1969) is a Cypriot judoka. He competed in the men's half-middleweight event at the 1992 Summer Olympics.

References

1969 births
Living people
Cypriot male judoka
Olympic judoka of Cyprus
Judoka at the 1992 Summer Olympics
Judoka at the 1990 Commonwealth Games
Commonwealth Games competitors for Cyprus
Place of birth missing (living people)